Dream Publisher  (original name – Založba Sanje) is a Slovenian publisher of fiction and non-fiction for both adults and children.

History 
The very first publishing project of Sanje in 1997 was a book of poems by the Slovene artist Frane Milčinski-Ježek.  Since then, literature and music have been the main objective of its production.  In the ten years of its existence, Dream Publisher has accomplished many projects.

Major recent achievements 
 National award for the best designed book three years running;
 National award for the best debut of the year 2006;
 7th edition of Festival Sanje (a one-month open-air nonprofit festival of non-mainstream music and literature, presenting the best of innovative and creative projects)
 National and international promotion of the Slovene writer Vladimir Bartol
 First translation of a novel directly from Japanese to Slovene (Norwegian Wood by Haruki Murakami), 2005
 Translations of Nobel prize winner Orhan Pamuk's The White Castle (2005), Snow (2006), and Istanbul: Memories of a City (2007)
 An international audio book collection by the poet France Prešeren (featuring Vanessa Redgrave, Katrin Cartlidge, Marjana Lipovšek, Simon Callow, Blixa Bargeld, etc.)
 The first complete translation of Goethe's Faust by into Slovene
 The African novels series, unique in Slovenia; initiated in 2004, it covers a range of classical and contemporary African authors.
 Sanje publishers is also active internationally, representing many Slovene writers in Europe and other countries (Vladimir Bartol, Desa Muck, Breda Smolnikar, and others) – www.sanjepublishing.com

Imprints / editions
 Roman SANJE (Sanje novels)
 Dokumenta (Barack Obama, Martin Luther King, jr., Ernesto Che Guevara, Sven Lindqvist, Carla del Ponte, ...)
 TIGR (radical, socially oriented thinkers: Noam Chomsky, Tiziano Terzani,...)
 KONTINENTI (Continents)
 Sanjska knjigica (children's books)
 Glasbena zbirka SANJE (music label)
 Zbirka zvočnih knjig SANJE (audiobooks)

Sanje festival (Dream Festival)

The Sanje festival is organized by the Association for the promotion of culture and organization of cultural events, SANJE FESTIVAL (short: SANJE FESTIVAL Association) in cooperation with Sanje Publishers, the programme staff and local cooperators – VsemuKos association from Novo Mesto (Dream World in Svet Teahouse, Novo Mesto), KŠK and Igrišče Association (Sanje Festival below Krvavec).

The festival is intended to enhance summer activity with quality programme comprising all fields of culture and science. It particularly focuses on authorial music, quality literature and entertaining-educative programmes for children, at the same time seeking to present artists, performers and projects from home and abroad to a wide audience.

The main venue of Sanje Festival remains the Zvezda Park in the centre of the capital where the festival has been set from its very beginning. In last three years a section of the festival is set below the spreading trees in Dvorje at Cerklje na Gorenjskem.

External links
Publisher's Slovene Website
Publisher's International Website
Dream Festival International Website

Publishing companies of Slovenia
Music publishing companies
Slovenian record labels
Small press publishing companies
Companies established in 1997
Publishing companies established in 1997
Publishing companies established in the 20th century
Music organizations based in Slovenia
Ljubljana